Citizens Activ is the fourth studio album by the Christian rapper Manafest.  It was released on May 28, 2008 in Japan and shortly after released globally on June 24, under BEC Recordings.

The release contains the singles "4-3-2-1", "So Beautiful", and "Good Day".

Critical reception
The album received positive to average reviews overall, with only a few musical sites being negative in their evaluations.

Both staff reviews from New Release Tuesday praised the album heavily. Nathan of NRT went on to add that "even people who are not fans of the rap genre may find themselves hopping on Manafest's band wagon -- at least for Citizens Activ. His tunes are just diverse enough to move past basic rap, and the rock he sprinkles in is also helpful. Add his meaningful lyrics and you have got a solid album despite the repetitive beats." Justin Mabee of Jesus Freak Hideout conquered by saying "while Citizens Activ may not be as up to par as his last release, Manafest has definitely matured since his debut and showcases those changes on this new release. Rock-infused raps abound, and fans of the rapper will likely find plenty to love here, adding on another record to their collection." Finally, Andy Argyrakis of Crosswalk.com plainly said when complementing the spiritual depth of the album: "Manafest shines with a meaningful centering and corresponding soundtrack he can just as easily take to church youth group kids as he can the inner city streets."

On the flip side, Rapzilla stated frankly in a more neutral opinion on the album: "Citizens Activ has a plethora of musical styles ranging from pop, rock, and rap.  I would think that this will be as successful as his critically acclaimed Glory disc, commercially.  But after listening to it, I can't really find myself attracted to this new manifestation of Manafest's manifesto."  Omar Mouallem of Exclaim! went on to say in a very negative opinion that "lyrically, he (Manafest) is about as innocuous as a bobble-head, which may or may not have something to do with his status as Christian rap. Manafest delivers the type of rap you wouldn't  mind your children listening to, so long as they outgrow it before high school."

Awards
The album was nominated for "Best Hip-Hop/Rap Album of the Year" at the 40th annual GMA Dove Awards.  The song "So Beautiful" off the release was also nominated for "Rap/Hip-Hop Recorded Song of the Year".

The album was also nominated for "Rap/Hip Hop Album of the Year" at the 30th annual GMA Canada Covenant Awards.  The song "Good Day" off the release was also nominated for "Rap/Hip Hop Song of the Year" the same year.  The following year, the song "4-3-2-1" won "Rap/Hip Hop Song of the Year".  Manafest himself was also nominated for Artist of the Year for his work with Citizens Activ in 2009.

Track listing

Personnel
Manafest - lead vocals, executive producer
Trevor McNevan - additional vocals on tracks 2 & 8
Stacey Kaniuk - backing vocals on track 4
Madison Jefferson - backing vocals on track 10
Eden Jefferson - backing vocals on track 10
Aubrey "Bre" Noronha - backing vocals on tracks 11 & 13
Promise - backing vocals on track 12
Adam Messinger - mixing (all tracks), mastering
Rob Berger - mixing on tracks 5, 6, 7, 8, 10, 11 & 13
Zale "Zalezy" Epstein - additional production on track 5
Al-Khaaliq (Nick Brongers) - additional production on track 10
Charles "DJ Versatile" Sabota - cuts; Scratching on track 10
Jeff Carver - A&R
Melanie Greenwood - art direction, photography
Donna Milanka - photography
Janice Kim - illustration

Music videos

Notes
In 2009, Manafest began to release a series of album instrumentals for many of his releases.  Citizens Activ was the first to receive such a version.
In 2013, the two bonus tracks featured on the Japanese release of the album were re-released on the deluxe edition of Manafest's previous album Glory.
In 2018, the song "4-3-2-1" appeared in "What the Puck", the eighth episode of Season 3 of the Lethal Weapon TV series.

References 

2008 albums
Albums produced by Boi-1da
BEC Recordings albums
Tooth & Nail Records albums
Manafest albums